"Sweet As Sugar" is the only single released by Australian rock band Grinspoon from their compilation album Best In Show. It was released in October 2005 as a digital download by Universal Music Australia. The song polled at number 42 on Triple J's Hottest 100 for 2005.

The band's bass player, Joe Hansen describes the song as a "pretty-straight-ahead, good rockin' tune."

Reception
Australian music website, Faster Louder, described "Sweet As Sugar" as being reminiscent of Thrills, Kills & Sunday Pills with its pop/rock sound. The review goes on to state that it "isn’t a slow song and is full of that constant bass guitar strum and hammering drums that we have all come to associate with Grinspoon, and is without those screaming vocals from Phil Jamieson but still maintains a strong and steady performance." "It’s one of those infectious songs that stays in your head after you hear it where you will find yourself constantly singing the chorus."

Rob Smith of The Dwarf is more critical, stating that "Sweet As Sugar" "is not as the name suggests. It fails to stand out in the crowd of Grinspoon hits that proceed it."

Music video
The music video for "Sweet As Sugar" was directed by James Barr and produced by James Moore.

Track listing

External links
 Music Video "Sweet as Sugar" - YouTube

References

2005 singles
Grinspoon songs
2005 songs
Universal Music Group singles
Songs written by Pat Davern
Songs written by Phil Jamieson